Jovan Kavarić (born 1934 in Ponari, Zeta Banovina, Kingdom of Yugoslavia) is a Montenegrin clinical biochemist and politician.

Kavarić attended the University of Sarajevo - Faculty of Science in Sarajevo, and later finished the third degree of medical school at the University of Zagreb - School of Medicine in Zagreb. Kavarić later received his doctorate from the University of Zagreb - Faculty of Science.

Kavarić served as mayor of Titograd from 1989 to 1990.

Kavarić is currently a professor of biochemistry and clinical biochemistry at the University of Montenegro's Faculty of Science and Faculty of Medicine in Podgorica.

References 
  National Parks of Montenegro: Biography of Dr. Jovan Kavarić

1934 births
Living people
Mayors of Podgorica
Montenegrin politicians